The Rival Ladies is a 1664 tragicomedy by the English writer John Dryden. It was originally performed by the King's Company at the Theatre Royal then in Brydges Street. Dryden dedicated the published version to the Irish politician and playwright the Earl of Orrery.

References

Bibliography
 Van Lennep, W. The London Stage, 1660-1800: Volume One, 1660-1700. Southern Illinois University Press, 1960.

1664 plays
West End plays
Tragedy plays
Plays by John Dryden